Şişli may refer to:

 Şişli, District of Istanbul
 Şişli Plaza, tower in Istanbul, Turkey and has 40 residential floors

People with the surname
 Mehmet Şenol Şişli, Turkish rock musician

Turkish-language surnames